Lee So-ra (Korean: 이소라; born November 4, 1969) is a South Korean model and Radio DJ. She was an original member of Roommate. She started her career by winning the Super Model Contest. She is currently a DJ on a radio show titled Lee So Ra's Gayo Plaza.

Filmography

TV shows

References

External links

1969 births
Living people
South Korean female models
South Korean television presenters
South Korean women television presenters
South Korean radio presenters
South Korean women radio presenters